Atte Erik Harjanne (born 13 July 1984 in Helsinki) is a Finnish politician currently serving in the Parliament of Finland for the Green League at the Helsinki constituency.

In 2021 Harjanne was nominated the chairperson of the Green parliamentary group.

References

1984 births
Living people
Politicians from Helsinki
Green League politicians
Members of the Parliament of Finland (2019–23)